Rowing was contested at the 1993 Summer Universiade in St. Catharines in Canada.

Medal summary

Medal table

Men's events

Women's events

External links
 Results on HickokSports.com
 1993 Summer Universiade results
 Results on sports123.com

Universiade
1993 Summer Universiade